Ese Ejja or Tiatinagua may refer to:
 Ese Ejja people, an indigenous group of Bolivia and Peru
 Ese Ejja language, a language of Bolivia and Peru

Language and nationality disambiguation pages